In Greek mythology, Phemonoe was a Greek poet of the ante-Homeric period. She was said to have been the daughter of Apollo, his first priestess at Delphi, or of his possible son Delphus, and the inventor of the hexameter verses, a type of poetic metre. In some studies, attributed to the phrase "know thyself" (γνῶθι σεαυτόν) found inscribed at the entrance to the Temple of Apollo at Delphi. Some writers seem to have placed her at Delos instead of Delphi; and Servius identifies her with the Cumaean Sibyl. The tradition which ascribed to her the invention of the hexameter, was by no means uniform; Pausanias, for example, as quoted above, calls her the first who used it, but in another passage he quotes an hexameter distich, which was ascribed to the Pleiades, who lived before Phemonoe: the traditions respecting the invention of the hexameter are collected by Fabricius. There were poems which went under the name of Phemonoe, like the old religious poems which were ascribed to Orpheus, Musaeus, and the other mythological bards. Melampus, for example, quotes from her in his book Peri Palmon Mantike ("On Twitches") §17, §18; and Pliny quotes from her respecting eagles and hawks, evidently from some book of augury, and perhaps from a work which is still extant in MS., entitled Orneosophium. There is an epigram of Antipater of Thessalonica, alluding to a statue of Phemonoe, dressed in a pharos.

Notes

References 
Darius Del Corno. Graecorum de re Onirocritica Scriptorum Reliquiae. No. 26, 1969.
Pausanias, Description of Greece with an English Translation by W.H.S. Jones, Litt.D., and H.A. Ormerod, M.A., in 4 Volumes. Cambridge, MA, Harvard University Press; London, William Heinemann Ltd. 1918. . Online version at the Perseus Digital Library
Pausanias, Graeciae Descriptio. 3 vols. Leipzig, Teubner. 1903.  Greek text available at the Perseus Digital Library.
Pliny the Elder, The Natural History. John Bostock, M.D., F.R.S. H.T. Riley, Esq., B.A. London. Taylor and Francis, Red Lion Court, Fleet Street. 1855. Online version at the Perseus Digital Library.
Pliny the Elder, Naturalis Historia. Karl Friedrich Theodor Mayhoff. Lipsiae. Teubner. 1906. Latin text available at the Perseus Digital Library.
Publius Vergilius Maro, Aeneid. Theodore C. Williams. trans. Boston. Houghton Mifflin Co. 1910. Online version at the Perseus Digital Library.
Publius Vergilius Maro, Bucolics, Aeneid, and Georgics. J. B. Greenough. Boston. Ginn & Co. 1900. Latin text available at the Perseus Digital Library.
Strabo, The Geography of Strabo. Edition by H.L. Jones. Cambridge, Mass.: Harvard University Press; London: William Heinemann, Ltd. 1924. Online version at the Perseus Digital Library.
Strabo, Geographica edited by A. Meineke. Leipzig: Teubner. 1877. Greek text available at the Perseus Digital Library.

External links
The Ancient Library - Phemonoe

Classical oracles
Ancient Greek poets
Greek mythological priestesses
Delphi
Ancient Delos
Children of Apollo